Provenance is the origin and/or history of an object.

Provenance may also refer to:

Arts and entertainment
 Provenance (album), a 2015 album by Paul Grabowsky and Vince Jones
 Provenance (novel), a 2017 novel by Ann Leckie
 The Provenance, a Swedish goth metal band

Film and television
 Provenance (film), a 2016 British drama film
 "Provenance" (Numb3rs), an episode of Numb3ers
 "Provenance" (Supernatural), an episode of Supernatural
 "Provenance" (The X Files), an episode of The X Files

Other uses
 Provenance (geology), the reconstruction of the origin of sediments
Provenance (information technologies), describe how an artifact or set of artifacts was produced